William S. Root (December 12, 1923 – March 18, 2002) was an American professional bridge player, teacher, and writer. He was from Boca Raton, Florida.

Root was inducted into the ACBL Hall of Fame in 1997. The American Contract Bridge League observed in his citation, "Root was perhaps the best known bridge teacher in the world – and has probably taught the game to more people than anyone in history."

Life

Root was born in New York City and raised in Miami, Florida. He died at age 79 in Boca Raton, Florida.

Jettison play

One of the most famous hands in his books is a seven notrump contract requiring a very advanced jettison play. High cards often get in the declarer's way, that is they block the effective play of the hand. A solution to these blocking problems is to throw away high cards. This unblocking coup is known as the jettison play.

 Win the opening lead of J with the ace, dropping the king of spades. Cash the queen of spades, and jettison the ace of hearts from hand. Now cash the top hearts in dummy and jettison the top three clubs from hand! You can now run the clubs to discard diamond losers. This line of play has the advantage of trying out the club suit before seeing if the diamonds run. Due to this particular hand layout, the diamonds don't run because of the 4-0 split, while the clubs run because of the singleton 10. If the clubs did not split favorably, declarer could still try to run the diamonds using dummy's 3 to get back into declarer's hand.

Bridge accomplishments

Honors
 ACBL Hall of Fame, 1997

Wins
 North American Bridge Championships (14)
 Vanderbilt (4) 1968, 1983, 1986, 1995
 Spingold (3) 1961, 1966, 1967
 Chicago (now Reisinger) (1) 1957
 Reisinger (5) 1967, 1982, 1983, 1984, 1990
 Men's Pairs (1) 1953

Runners-up
 Bermuda Bowl (1) 1967
 World Open Team Olympiad (1) 1968
 North American Bridge Championships (9)
 Spingold (3) 1963, 1974, 1978
 Reisinger (1) 1966
 Grand National Teams (1) 1992
 Men's Board-a-Match Teams (1) 1963
 North American Men's Swiss Teams (1) 1984
 Life Master Pairs (1) 1995
 Open Pairs (1) 1966
 United States Bridge Championships (4)
 Open Team Trials (3) 1984, 1987, 1992
 Open Pair Trials (1) 1967

Books
 
  Prentice-Hall (Englewood Cliffs, N.J.), ; Frederick Muller (London). Both 154 pp.
 ——— (1972) [c1971]. New Contract Bridge Outlines on Standard Bidding. Crown Publishers (New York). 64 pages. 
  96 pp.
  Crown, ; Three Rivers Press (New York), ; (1992) CrownTrade Paperbacks, . All 244 pp.
  Crown,  (hardcover),  (softcover); 1995, Three Rivers, . 216 pp.
  309 pp.
  410 pp.
  281 pp.

References

External links
 
 
 

1923 births
2002 deaths
American contract bridge players
Bermuda Bowl players
Contract bridge writers
People from Boca Raton, Florida